"Nothing" is a song by Irish pop rock band the Script from their second studio album, Science & Faith. The song was released as the second single on 19 November 2010. It was written and produced by Danny O'Donoghue, Mark Sheehan, Steve Kipner, and Andrew Frampton. The song charted at number 15 in Ireland, and at number 42 in the United Kingdom. In the United States, the song debuted at number 89 on the Billboard Hot 100, peaking at number 32 on 29 October 2011.

Background
The song is told from the first-person point of view of a man who drinks himself to a stupor after he and his girlfriend break up. Unable to accept that everything is over, he calls her and tells her his feelings, but the girl does not make any response, hence the title "Nothing". The band performed the song during the Children in Need telethon of 2010, and as part of the 2010 Christmas special "Ruth Jones' Christmas Cracker".

Music video
The music video was directed by Charles Mehling. It shows Danny and his bandmates having a drink at their local bar. Danny gets drunk and goes out of the bar, singing about how he's still in love with her. He then jumps into Camden Lock and starts hallucinating that the girl he loves is swimming with him. He almost drowns, but gets rescued by police, where the music video ends.

Track listing
Digital download
 "Nothing" – 4:31
 "Nothing" (Music Video) – 4:33

Personnel
Songwriting – Danny O'Donoghue, Mark Sheehan, Steve Kipner, Andrew Frampton
Production – Mark Sheehan, Danny O'Donoghue, Andrew Frampton, Steve Kipner
Drums, guitars, keyboards and vocals – The Script
Guitars, keyboards and programming – Andrew Frampton
Bass – Ben Sargeant

Source:

Charts

Weekly charts

Year-end charts

Certifications

References

External links
 

2010 singles
The Script songs
Rock ballads
Songs written by Steve Kipner
2010 songs
Songs written by Danny O'Donoghue
Songs written by Mark Sheehan
Phonogenic Records singles
Epic Records singles
Songs written by Andrew Frampton (songwriter)
Songs about alcohol